Anna Łukasiak is a Polish freestyle wrestler. She won one of the bronze medals in the women's 50kg event at the 2022 World Wrestling Championships held in Belgrade, Serbia. She is a two-time bronze medalist at the European Wrestling Championships.

Career 

In 2019, she lost her bronze medal match in the 50 kg event at the European Games held in Minsk, Belarus.

In April 2021, she won one of the bronze medals in the 50 kg event at the European Wrestling Championships held in Warsaw, Poland.

In March 2022, she won one of the bronze medals in the 50 kg event at the European Wrestling Championships held in Budapest, Hungary. A few months later, she won the bronze medal in her event at the Matteo Pellicone Ranking Series 2022 held in Rome, Italy.

Achievements

References

External links 
 

Living people
Year of birth missing (living people)
Place of birth missing (living people)
Polish female sport wrestlers
European Wrestling Championships medalists
World Wrestling Championships medalists
Wrestlers at the 2019 European Games
European Games competitors for Poland
21st-century Polish women